I'm the One may refer to:

Albums
 I'm the One (Annette Peacock album), a 1972 album by Annette Peacock
 I'm the One (Roberta Flack album), a 1982 album by Roberta Flack

Songs
 "I'm the One" (Gerry and the Pacemakers song) (1964)
 "I'm the One" from Van Halen (1978) by Van Halen
 "I'm the One" from I'm the One (1982) by Roberta Flack
 "I'm the One" from One Down (1982) by Material
 "I'm the One" (Descendents song) from Everything Sucks (1996) by Descendents
 "I'm the One" from Karma and Effect (2005) by Seether
 "I'm the One" (Static-X song) from Start a War (2005) by Static-X
 "I'm the One" from The Cheetah Girls: One World (2008) by The Cheetah Girls
 "I'm the One" from Out of My Hands (2012) by Morten Harket
 "I'm the One" (DJ Khaled song) from Grateful (2017) by DJ Khaled

See also
 I'm the One... Nobody Else, a 1992 album by Brigitte Nielsen
 "I'm One", a song by The Who